Must Read After My Death is a 2009 documentary film directed produced by Morgan Dews. It follows Allis, her husband Charley, in Hartford, Connecticut throughout the 1960s. The film received critical acclaim, receiving 90% positive reviews at the website Rotten Tomatoes.

Synopsis
When a Hartford couple turns to psychiatry for help with their marriage, things quickly spiral out of control. Couples counseling, individual and group therapy and 24-hour marathon sessions ensue. Their four children suffer and are given their own psychiatrists. Pills are prescribed, people are institutionalized, shock-therapy is administered. This is an intimate story in the family's own words, from an extraordinary collection of audio recordings and home movies, illuminating a difficult and extraordinary time.

Production

Soundtrack

The film's striking soundscape was composed by Emmy nominated musician Paul Damian Hogan.

Distribution
The film had its US premiere in 2008 at the Los Angeles Film Festival. Gigantic Digital released Must Read After My Death in February 2009. It was the first film to be released Day-and-Date in theaters and online.  Gigantic managed to control the availability of the film online, blocking it in markets where the film was playing theatrically—often the only conditions under which the exhibitors would agree to screen the film. Must Read After My Death played theatrically in New York for two weeks and in Los Angeles for one week. It was the highest earning film at the Laemmle Sunset 5 during its run.

Reception

Critical response

Accolades

References

2007 films
American documentary films
2007 documentary films
Documentary films about child abuse
Documentary films about violence against women
History of women in Connecticut
1960s in Connecticut
2000s English-language films
2000s American films
Violence against women in the United States